The 1927–28 season was Chelsea Football Club's nineteenth competitive season and fourth consecutive season in the Second Division. The club finished 3rd in the league, narrowly missing out on promotion to the First Division.

Table

References

External links
 1927–28 season at stamford-bridge.com

1927–28
English football clubs 1927–28 season